Alexandre Aparecido Reche Bernardes (born 26 March 1986), commonly known as Alexandre Matão, is a Brazilian footballer who currently plays as a forward.

Career statistics

Club

Notes

References

1986 births
Living people
Brazilian footballers
Brazilian expatriate footballers
Association football forwards
Mogi Mirim Esporte Clube players
Fluminense FC players
União Agrícola Barbarense Futebol Clube players
Esporte Clube Juventude players
Grêmio Esportivo Brasil players
Esporte Clube São José players
GAIS players
Grêmio Esportivo Glória players
Gil Vicente F.C. players
C.F. União players
Esporte Clube Internacional players
Cerâmica Atlético Clube players
Futebol Clube Santa Cruz players
Sport Club São Paulo players
Rio Branco Football Club players
Al Hala SC players
Ras Al Khaimah Club players
Dibba Al-Hisn Sports Club players
Al Dhaid SC players
Al-Arabi SC (UAE) players
Al-Okhdood Club players
Campeonato Brasileiro Série D players
Allsvenskan players
Liga Portugal 2 players
Segunda Divisão players
Bahraini Premier League players
UAE First Division League players
Saudi Second Division players
Brazilian expatriate sportspeople in Sweden
Expatriate footballers in Sweden
Brazilian expatriate sportspeople in Portugal
Expatriate footballers in Portugal
Brazilian expatriate sportspeople in Vietnam
Expatriate footballers in Vietnam
Brazilian expatriate sportspeople in Oman
Expatriate footballers in Oman
Brazilian expatriate sportspeople in Bahrain
Expatriate footballers in Bahrain
Brazilian expatriate sportspeople in the United Arab Emirates
Expatriate footballers in the United Arab Emirates
Brazilian expatriate sportspeople in Saudi Arabia
Expatriate footballers in Saudi Arabia
People from Jaboticabal